is a 1982 maze chase arcade game developed and published by Namco. It was distributed in North America by Midway Games. Super Pac-Man is Namco's take on a sequel to the original Pac-Man; Midway had previously released Ms. Pac-Man, which Namco had little involvement with. Toru Iwatani returns as designer.

Gameplay

Sound and gameplay mechanics were altered radically from the first two entries into the Pac-Man series—instead of eating dots, the player is required to eat keys in order to open doors, which open up sections of the maze that contain what in earlier games were known as "fruits" (foods such as apples and bananas, or other prizes such as Galaxian flagships), which are now the basic items that must be cleared. Once all the food is eaten, the player advances to the next level, in which the food is worth more points. In earlier levels, keys unlock nearby doors, while as the player progresses through the levels, it is more common for keys to open faraway doors. Pac-Man can enter the ghost house at any time without a key.

In addition to the original power pellets which allow Pac-Man to eat the ghosts, two "Super" pellets are available and will turn Pac-Man into Super Pac-Man for a short time. In this form, he becomes much larger, can move with increased speed when the "Super Speed" button is held down and has the ability to eat through doors without unlocking them. He is also invulnerable to the ghosts, who appear thin and flat in order to give the illusion of Super Pac-Man "flying" over them. He still cannot eat them without the help of the original power-up. When Super Pac-Man is about to revert to regular Pac-Man, he flashes white. The Super power can then be prolonged by eating a power pellet or super pellet, if available.

A point bonus can be scored if Pac-Man eats a star that appears between the two center boxes while assorted symbols flash inside them. Usually, one symbol stops while the other continues until the star is eaten, a life is lost, or too much time elapses.  If the star is eaten when two symbols match, the bonus is 2000 points for any match, and 5000 points if the matching symbols are the same as the level being played.  Otherwise, the bonus is similar to the award for eating a ghost, which is 200, 400, 800 or 1600 points, depending on the level. (On some versions, higher levels might pay out the 2000 or 5000 points no matter what the symbols are.)

Bonus levels appear at intervals. Here, the player is presented with a maze full of food items and must eat them all in order to collect the points on a countdown timer. Pac-Man appears in Super Mode throughout the stage, and there are no ghosts.

Reception
Upon release in 1982, Midway projected that the game would sell about 10,000 to 15,000 arcade units in the United States. By May 1983, it was the top-earning arcade game of the month.

Arcade Express rated the arcade game 8 out of 10, stating that the "newly-designed maze features keys, locked doors, and Super Energy Dots, making it the latest thrill for gobbler-lovers." The review also praises the ability to increase Pac-Man's size with the "Super Dots" as well as the "Super-Speed" button that increases his movement speed.

Iwatani himself was critical on the game, criticizing how big Pac-Man was while in Super form and also calling it overall boring.

Ports
Ports for the Casio PV-2000 and the Sord M5 were released in Japan under the titles Mr. Packn and Power Pac. In 1988, MS-DOS and Commodore 64 versions were released.

Ports for the Atari 5200 and the Atari 8-bit computers were finished in 1984, but not published.

Legacy

 In 1996, Super Pac-Man appeared on the second Namco Museum arcade compilation for Sony's PlayStation (not included in the Japanese version).
In 1998, Namco released Super Pac-Man as part of Namco History Volume 3 for the PC in Japan only.
 In 1999, Super Pac-Man was included alongside Ms. Pac-Man in Ms. Pac-Man: Special Color Edition for Nintendo's Game Boy Color system.
 In 2006, Jakks Pacific released the Plug and Play Super Pac-Man joystick that contained Super Pac-Man along with Pac-Man, Pac-Man Plus, and Pac & Pal. Super Pac-Man is also featured in TV Games' Pac-Man: Gold Edition & Retro Arcade.
 Namco has released a portable version on select cell phone models exclusively on Sprint. . As a promotion, Sprint and Namco ran a sweepstakes which offered the grand prize winner a Volkswagen New Beetle customized with Super Pac-Man art.  The car was on display at major videogame tradeshow E3 in Los Angeles in May 2006.  The Sweepstakes began June 1, 2006 and ended on July 31, 2006.
 Namco released Super Pac-Man along with Pac & Pal, Pac 'n Roll, Pac-Mania and other non-Pac-Man games in Namco Museum Remix and Namco Museum Megamix, in late 2007 and late 2010 respectively.
 Namco re-released Super Pac-Man on mobile phones as a deluxe version with updated 3D graphics and redone sound effects.
 On November 4, 2008, Super Pac-Man was released in Namco Museum Virtual Arcade for the Xbox 360.
 Super Pac-Man was released as part of Pac-Man Museum in 2014.
 Hamster released Super Pac-Man as part of their Arcade Archives series on January 6, 2022 for PlayStation 4 and Nintendo Switch.
 Super Pac-Man is included in the compilation title Pac-Man Museum + as an unlockable title, which released on May 27, 2022 for PC, PlayStation 4, Xbox One and Nintendo Switch.

Notes

References

External links

1982 video games
Arcade video games
Pac-Man arcade games
Cancelled Atari 5200 games
Cancelled Atari 8-bit family games
Commodore 64 games
Maze games
Midway video games
Mobile games
Namco arcade games
Video games developed in Japan